Petrila is a town in the Jiu Valley, Hunedoara County, Transylvania, Romania. It is located near the confluence of the rivers Jiul de Est, Taia, and Jieț.

The town administers four villages: Cimpa (Csimpa), Jieț (Zsiec), Răscoala (Reszkola), and Tirici.

History
A Romanian town in the Carpathian Mountains, Petrila is an ancient settlement, but its existence was not documented until 1493 in a donation letter between Vladislav the First, King of Hungary and a Romanian prince named Mihai Cande.

The name of the town was noted in 1733 as coming from the Latin word “petrinus” ("pietros" in Romanian), which can be translated into English to mean “of stone”, a reference to the large coal deposits in the area that would become a profitable export in the Industrial Revolution. The exploitation of coal deposits in and around Petrila made the town grow as a single-industry town, revolving either around the mining of coal or the processing of the coal mined there, which is listed under the grade “Pitcoal”. Mining operations began in 1840, but the town would remain sparsely populated until the arrival of Western Moldavian workers forced to relocate by the former president of Romania Nicolae Ceaușescu under Communist rule. The restructuring of the economy since the Romanian Revolution of 1989 has led to a decrease in production and supply for the region, including Petrila. 

It was the site in recent times of the Petrila Mine disaster, wherein two methane gas explosions in a coal mine on November 15, 2008 killed at least 12 miners and/or rescue workers. This is not the first time this millennium a coal mine in Petrila has suffered such an incident; another similar incident occurred in 2001.

Economy
The mining in the town began in 1840 and the peak production of coal was in 1984 1,255,240 tonnes, since then it decreased to 504,000 tonnes.

Population

As of 2011, it had a population of 21,373. Of these, 93.97% were Romanians, 4.9% Hungarians and 0.73% Roma.

Natives
 (1930–2015), composer
Ferenc Doór (1918–2015), painter
Alexandru Hrisanide (1936–2018 ), composer
Josef Kappl (b. 1950), rock musician
Horațiu Lasconi (b. 1963), footballer
Ion Dezideriu Sîrbu (1919–1989), philosopher and novelist
Maria von Tasnady (1911–2001), actress
Daniel Timofte (b. 1967), footballer

See also
Jiu Valley

References

External links
Official Petrila website
Jiu Valley Portal - the regional portal host of the official Petrila and other Jiu Valley city websites

Towns in Romania
Jiu Valley
Populated places in Hunedoara County
Localities in Transylvania
Mining communities in Romania
Monotowns in Romania